Changchun Gymnasium is an indoor sporting arena located in Changchun, China.  The capacity of the arena is 4,299 spectators and opened in 1957.  It hosts indoor sporting events such as basketball and volleyball.  Prior to 2012 it hosted the Jilin Northeast Tigers of the Chinese Basketball Association. The new arena is located on the campus of Northeast Normal University (Dongbei Shida  东北师大)

See also
 Sports in China

References

Indoor arenas in China
Sports venues in Jilin
Basketball venues in China
Sports venues completed in 1957